The Danish National Library Authority is an inter-disciplinary public and research library institution and an independent agency under the Danish Ministry of Culture. It is the Danish government's central administrative and advisory body to the public libraries and the research libraries as well as the administrative authority for the Danish law no. 340, Act on library activities (Lov om Biblioteksvirksomhed) of 17 May 2000, and the amendment, law no. 30 of 10 January 2005.

The ideal aim of the institution is at any time to ensure the optimal exploitation of resources and the development of the cooperative Danish library service across municipal and governmental sectors.

The institution’s primary administrative task is to administrate a number of grants and pools to authors, via the Public Lending Right scheme, special libraries or projects, to be responsible for standards, including cataloguing and classification, and to develop national services like bibliotek.dk, the national webbased search-, request- and ordering facility.

Apart from the administration of Act on library activities, the institution has no formal executive power in relation to the libraries, but runs for the most part its development tasks on the basis of grants given to projects which pursue the development of new services or as temporary strategic grants.

History
Statens Bibliotekstilsyn (State Inspectorate of Public Libraries) was created on 5 March 1920, following the first Danish library act, law no. 160 of the same date. The object of the inspectorate was to implement the law. In practice this meant administrating annual government grants to the public libraries and to advise on collections, premises and staff and to keep a watch on whether the local authorities complied with the regulations in the library act. In 1964, it changed name to Bibliotekstilsynet.

In 1986, the Rigsbibliotekarembedet (Office of the National Librarian), which had been created in 1943 under the Danish Royal Library, became an independent institution. It was merged with Bibliotekstilsynet in 1990 to form Statens Bibliotekstjeneste (State Library Service), when the public libraries changed status as purely municipal institutions and state inspection of the public libraries ceased. It in turn changed name in 1997 to the current Biblioteksstyrelse (Danish National Library Authority).

From 1920 - 1961, the agency was under the Ministry of Education.

1920 establishments in Denmark
National Library Authority
National Library Authority
National Library Authority
Organizations established in 1920